Racebending was coined as a term of protest in 2009 as a response to the casting decisions for the live-action film adaptation of the television series Avatar: The Last Airbender. The starring roles of the show (Aang, Katara, and Sokka) were coded as being of East Asian (Aang) and Inuit (Katara, and Sokka) descent, but were played by actors of European descent in the film. The initial protests such as "Saving the World with Postage," were created in a LiveJournal online forum that initially responded to the casting decisions by "inundating Paramount with protest mail." However, the cast went unaltered and when production began, the leaders of this protest responded by founding the advocacy group and accompanying website Racebending by "playfully borrowing the concept of manipulating elements (bending) from the Avatar universe."

The Racebending.com website defines "racebending" as, "situations where a media content creator (movie studio, publisher, etc.) has changed the race or ethnicity of a character. This is a longstanding Hollywood practice that has been historically used to discriminate against people of color." The website also states that the issue predates the coining of the term. According to Christopher Campbell, whitewashing in film is particularly common, and "possesses a long tradition among the industry's most successful and venerated productions. Film history is replete with ignominious examples of white actors portraying characters of color."

Reasons for racebending
In the United States entertainment industry, Christina Shu Jien Chong has stated that racebending, whitewashing and an overall lack of representation of Asian Americans, as well as other minorities in the film industry is not due to lack of minority applicants, but instead due to lack of opportunities for minorities due to a connection-based culture in the entertainment industry created through implicit bias, and breakdowns, casting descriptions that usually include characteristics including a characters name, gender, age, race, minor personality traits and a brief life background. Chong does not consider breakdowns problematic in themselves, but as stated by Russell Robinson in a research article published by the Berkeley Law Scholarship Repository, they tend to discriminate against minorities in the entertainment industry. Part of Robinson's argument against breakdowns is that they are usually created by studio directors and 87% of directors are white. Robinson claims that these directors as well as others within the film industry can easily decide to change the race of a breakdown or of a character being adapted from another form of media. Robinson stated, "Any person in this decision-making chain might exclude an actor or an entire category of actors based on race or sex-based considerations, yet this discrimination would normally remain concealed from the excluded applicants and the public." According to Robinson, there are circles of "the wealthy elite in Hollywood" whose "implicit biases", covered up by breakdowns, lead to a significant amount of racebending and whitewashing within the film industry.

Many producers and directors in the film industry believe that it is not racial discrimination that leads to racebending, whitewashing, and an overall lack of minority representation in the film industry. Instead, many accredit it to a low number of minority applicants and the lack of funding they would receive if they did cast minorities in lead roles. In response to critic backlash after the release of the film 21, which is based on the true story of a group of Asian American students who in the film are portrayed mostly by Caucasian actors, producer Dana Brunetti claimed, "We would have loved to cast Asians in the lead roles, but the truth is, we didn't have access to any bankable Asian-American actors that we wanted." Furthermore, Ridley Scott claimed, after the release of his film Exodus: Gods and Kings, which faced a similar whitewashing controversy, "I can't mount a film of this budget, where I have to rely on tax rebates in Spain and say that my lead actor is Muhammad so-and-so from such-and-such. I'm just not going to get it financed. So the question doesn't even come up."

Examples
After the producers of The Last Airbender announced their decision to cast white actors Noah Ringer, Nicola Peltz and Jackson Rathbone as the lead roles, the artists who had worked on the animated series it was based on created an anonymous LiveJournal website and started a letter-writing campaign. On the other hand, the actors portraying the antagonist characters are mainly Middle Eastern and Indian. Two fans from the LiveJournal website, known as glockgal and jedifreac, realized there were more cases regarding racebending other than The Last Airbender movie, leading them to create their own forum against racebending as a whole, Racebending.com.

In 2010, Racebending.com wrote a letter to Nickelodeon's CEO at the time, Jeff Dunn, regarding the audition restrictions for Power Rangers Samurai, the eighteenth season of the Power Rangers franchise. The producers of the show had restricted auditions for the Red Ranger to only white actors, but the casting was re-opened in June 2010 to actors of all ethnicities.

The film Exodus: Gods and Kings received significant backlash on social media before its release, due to white actors Christian Bale, Joel Edgerton and others being cast to play the roles of Egyptians, while black actors were only given the roles of slaves and thieves. Director Ridley Scott argued that they cast actors of other ethnicities as well (Iranians, Spaniards, Arabs, etc.) because Egyptians have varied ethnicities, and that the audience should not focus on only the white actors.

In 2010, Racebending.com and the Media Action Network for Asian Americans, alongside urging boycotts of The Last Airbender, also urged boycotts of Prince of Persia: The Sands of Time as well, due to practices of racebending. Prince of Persia was criticized for casting white actors for the leads instead of actors of Iranian or Middle Eastern descent.

When Scarlett Johansson was cast in the lead role of Motoko Kusanagi in Ghost in the Shell, a live-action adaptation of the Japanese manga, there was fan backlash over the casting as, since the story is located within Japan, it was assumed that the actress to portray the character was meant to be of Japanese descent, and numerous fans signed petitions for a recast. Johansson addressed the issue in an interview with Marie Claire, stating that she never would have accepted the role if it meant taking it from an Asian actor. Johansson explained how she accepted the part because the main protagonist was female and "having a franchise with a female protagonist driving it is such a rare opportunity." Activists groups, such as the Media Action Network for Asian Americans (MANAA) accused Johansson of lying that she would never portray or attempt to play someone of a different race. Their complaints stemmed from the idea that they believed Hollywood was not allowing Asians to portray Asian characters, and instead, was hiring white actors to take roles that could easily have been portrayed by an Asian actor and actress. Asian actors such as Constance Wu and Ming-Na Wen called for a boycott of the film because they thought it was unfair that the role did not go to an Asian woman. The Founding President of MANAA, Guy Aoki, stated, "Hollywood continues to make the same excuses, that there aren't big enough Asian/Asian American names to open a blockbuster film. Yet it has not developed a farm system where such actors get even third billing in most pictures. Without a conscientious effort, how will anyone ever break through and become familiar enough with audiences so producers will confidently allow them to topline a film? When will we ever break that glass ceiling?" The film spawned many different conversations on how to allow actors and actresses of minority groups to have the spotlight, as well as created discussions on how to end these endemic problems throughout Hollywood. In contrast to the controversy, Mamoru Oshii, director of the 1995 anime film, defended Johansson's casting and even cited the casting being in line with the themes, story, and source material of the book, specifically saying "The Major is a cyborg and her physical form is an entirely assumed one. The name 'Motoko Kusanagi' and her current body are not her original name and body, so there is no basis for saying that an Asian actress must portray her...I believe having Scarlett play Motoko was the best possible casting for this movie. I can only sense a political motive from the people opposing it, and I believe artistic expression must be free from politics."

Conversely, when Harry Potter received an addition to its installment with the stage play Harry Potter and the Cursed Child, it was announced that the character Hermione Granger would be played by Noma Dumezweni, an African actress residing in England. Fans were displeased with this and called it "reverse whitewashing", citing the books' prior mention of Hermione's skin tone, but J. K. Rowling, the author of the original book series, stated that white skin was never specified in the making of Hermione, but rather being intelligent and smart.

Another example of racebending occurred when Jodie Turner-Smith, who is a black woman, was cast to play Anne Boleyn, the second wife of Henry VIII and a white woman.

Other uses
The Racebending website acknowledges that often the terms "whitewashing" and "racebending" are used interchangeably, but claims that occasionally, the effects of racebending can have a positive impact. Racebending can, at times, result in increased representation for minorities if a "white role" is altered to be played by a minority. The website gave as examples of positive racebending Cinderella (Brandy Norwood) and Prince Christopher (Paolo Montalban) in The Wonderful World of Disney's retelling of Cinderella (1997), and Velma (Hayley Kiyoko) in Scooby-Doo! The Mystery Begins (2009), stating that, although minimal, "for communities of color, these casting decisions meant representation and meaningful inclusion in the American storytelling landscape."

Usage evolved, and by 2015, media studies academic Kristen J. Warner wrote that the term has "many definitions and contexts", from the film industry practice of color-blind casting to fan fiction. She describes how writers can "change the race and cultural specificity of central characters or pull a secondary character of color from the margins, transforming her into the central protagonist."

Pastes Abbey White said in 2016 that the term can apply to actors of color being cast in traditionally white roles. White said, "In the last several years, racebending has become a practice used more and more to help networks diversify their ensembles and capture a bigger audience. Not only has it resulted in more racial visibility on the small screen, but in a far more unexpected way, racebending can generate deeper and more significant depictions of characters."

Statistics
According to a 2016 University of Southern California report on diversity in entertainment within which 414 stories were sampled, 109 motion pictures and 305 broadcast, cable and digital series, "71.7% were white, 12.2% Black, 5.8% Hispanic/Latino, 5.1% Asian, 2.3% Middle Eastern and 3.1% other", in contrast to the United States Census Bureau's population estimates for July 2016 being "63.3% White, 12.6% Black, 16.2% Hispanic/Latino, 4.9% Asian, 2.1% mixed, 1.0% other." The University of Southern California report  noted that it sampled all "independent speaking character utters one or more discernible and overt words (of any language) on screen. Nonverbal utterances are not considered words. Characters that are named are also considered speaking characters. Under rare circumstances, a group of nearly identical characters might speak at the exact same time or sequentially. Given their extreme homogeneous appearance, it is impossible to distinguish these characters from another. When this occurs, the coders are instructed to "group" the identical characters and code them as one unit." According to Christina Shu Jien Chong's article in the Asian Pacific American Law Journal, "Whites occupied 83.5% of lead roles while minorities occupied 16.5%; 9.5% Black, 2% Latino, 2.5% Asian, 0.5% Native American, and 2% Mixed/Other." According to Chong, when it comes to casting for major roles, racebending, whitewashing and implicit bias lead to an even more drastic underrepresentation of minorities in the entertainment industry.

See also
 Blackface and blackface in contemporary art
 Redface
 Yellowface and examples of Yellowface
 Color-blind casting
 Whitewashing in film
 Hamilton (musical)

References

Bibliography
 
 
 
 
 Smith, Stacy L., et al. INCLUSION or INVISIBILITY? Comprehensive Annenberg Report on Diversity in Entertainment. USC Annenberg School for Communication and Journalism, 2016, INCLUSION or INVISIBILITY? Comprehensive Annenberg Report on Diversity in Entertainment.
 Chong, Christina, Where are the Asians in Hollywood? Can §1981, Title VII, Colorblind Pitches, and Understanding Biases Break the Bamboo Ceiling? (August 23, 2016). Asian Pacific American Law Journal, Vol. 21, issue 1, p. 29-79 (2016); Univ. of San Francisco Law Research Paper No. 2016-18. Available at SSRN: https://ssrn.com/abstract=2828261
 Russell K. Robinson, Casting and Caste-ing: Reconciling Artistic Freedom and  Antidiscrimination Norms, 95 Cal. L. Rev. (2007)
 Bazemore, Kendall. “Whitewashing vs Racebending.” The Odyssey Online, Odyssey, 12 Nov. 2017, www.theodysseyonline.com/whitewashing-racebending.	
 “Race and Ethnicity in the United States.” Race and Ethnicity in the United States - Statistical Atlas, statisticalatlas.com/United-States/Race-and-Ethnicity.

Further reading

External links
 What is "racebending"? at Racebending.com
 PSA: Whitewashing A Character Is Different From Michael B. Jordan Being Cast As Johnny Storm at The Mary Sue, which contrasts racebending and whitewashing

2000s neologisms
Cultural appropriation
Ethnic and racial stereotypes
Concepts in film theory
History of racism in the cinema of the United States
Avatar: The Last Airbender
Race-related controversies in film
Casting controversies in film